Carlos Andrés Mina (born 10 October 1992) is an Ecuadorian amateur boxer. He competed in the light heavyweight division at the 2016 Summer Olympics, but was eliminated in the third bout.

Mina is a composer and singer of rap music. In 2014 he recorded an album La Tinta under an alias Jeanthes Space. He starred in the documentary La Tola Box about his boxing gym La Tola and composed the soundtrack for it. His brother Nixon is an international basketball player, and his cousin Abel is a boxer.

References

External links

 

1992 births
Living people
Ecuadorian male boxers
Olympic boxers of Ecuador
Boxers at the 2016 Summer Olympics
Place of birth missing (living people)
AIBA World Boxing Championships medalists
Light-heavyweight boxers
21st-century Ecuadorian people